is a Japanese manga artist residing in Matsuyama, Ehime, Japan. She received the 2008 Shogakukan Manga Award for shōjo manga for Boku no Hatsukoi o Kimi ni Sasagu. Kotomi took her 2013 Manga, "The Liar and His Lover" and remade a new version that was released in 2017. Her story The Liar and His Lover was also adapted into both a 2013 Japanese film, Kanojo wa uso o aishisugiteiru. and a 2017 South Korean TV Series: Geunyeoneun Geojitmaleul Neomoo Saranghae.

Works 

Asa mo, Hiru mo, Yoru mo (Morning, Noon and Night)
Ashita, Anata ga Mezame tara
Boku no Hatsukoi o Kimi ni Sasagu
Boku wa Imōto ni Koi o Suru
Ijiwaru Shinaide!
Taiyou ga Ippai
Aishikata mo Wakarazuni
Jesus!
Kanojo wa Uso o Aishisugiteru
Kare wa Ike mo Shinai Kōshien wo Mezasu
Koisuru Heart ga No to Iu
Love and Tears
Motto Ikitai..

References

External links
  

1980 births
Living people
Women manga artists
Manga artists from Ehime Prefecture
People from Matsuyama, Ehime
Japanese female comics artists
Female comics writers
21st-century Japanese women writers